The Famous Five is a series of children's adventure novels and short stories written by English author Enid Blyton. The first book, Five on a Treasure Island, was published in 1942. The novels feature the adventures of a group of young children – Julian, Dick, Anne, George and their dog Timmy.

The vast majority of the stories take place in the children's school holidays. Each time they meet they get caught up in an adventure, often involving criminals or lost treasure. Sometimes the scene is set close to George's family home at Kirrin Cottage, such as the picturesque Kirrin Island, owned by George and her family in Kirrin Bay. George's own home and various other houses the children visit or stay in are hundreds of years old and often contain secret passages or smugglers' tunnels.

In some books the children go camping in the countryside, on a hike or holiday together elsewhere. However, the settings are almost always rural and enable the children to discover the simple joys of cottages, islands, the English and Welsh countryside and sea shores, as well as an outdoor life of picnics, bicycle trips and swimming.

Blyton intended to write only six or eight books in the series, but owing to their high sales and immense commercial success she went on to write twenty-one full-length Famous Five novels, as well as a number of other series in similar style following groups of children discovering crime on holiday. By the end of 1953, more than six million copies had been sold. Today, more than two million copies of the books are sold each year, making them one of the best-selling series for children ever written, with sales totalling over a hundred million. All the novels have been adapted for television, and several have been adapted as films in various countries.

Blyton's publisher, Hodder & Stoughton, first used the term "The Famous Five" in 1951, after nine books in the series had been published. Before this, the series was referred to as The 'Fives' Books.

Characters

The Five
 is the oldest of the five, cousin to George and elder brother to Dick and Anne. He is tall, strong and intelligent as well as caring, responsible and kind. His cleverness and reliability are often noted by Aunt Fanny. He is the leader of the group and is very protective towards Anne and sometimes, to her frustration, towards George. Julian is the most mature of the group but, although well-meaning, his manner can at times come over as overbearing, pompous or priggish.  At the start of the series, Julian is 12 years old. Over time, he reaches his goal of fully maturing into a young adult.
 has a cheeky sense of humour, but is also dependable and kind in nature. He is the same age as his cousin George, 1 year younger than his brother Julian and a year older than his sister Anne – eleven at the start of the series. Though inclined to tease his sister at times, Dick is, like Julian, very caring towards Anne and does his best to keep her cheered up when she gets upset. He had a heroic role in Five on a Treasure Island. He uses his wits and saves the five in many adventures but probably has the least clearly-drawn character of the four cousins.
George is a tomboy, who demands that people call her  instead of Georgina; she cuts her hair very short and dresses like a boy. She is headstrong and courageous by nature and, like her father, scientist Quentin Kirrin, has a hot and fiery temper. Introduced to the other characters in the first book, she later attends a boarding school with Anne where the teachers also agree to call her 'George'. Blyton eventually revealed that the character was based on herself. It is notable that the chief protagonist of the Malory Towers stories also possessed a fiery temper as a defining character trait. George has a loyal dog named Timmy who would do anything for her. She often gets cross when anyone calls her by her birth name or makes fun of Timmy, and she loves it when somebody calls her George or mistakes her for a boy. In Five Get into a Fix, old Mrs Janes mistakes her for a boy: even though Julian had told her that she was a girl, she later forgets this. George sometimes takes this to the point of asking that her name be prefixed with Master instead of Miss. Various references have been made to what meaning should be read into this – for instance "I remember reading in my first Famous Five book about a girl called Master George. What a puzzle and thrill. She claims to never tell lies as that is cowardly."
 is the youngest in the group, and generally takes care of the domestic duties during the Five's various camping holidays. As the youngest, she is more likely than the others to be frightened, and does not really enjoy the adventures as much as the others. She is ten years old in the first book of the series. She sometimes lets her tongue run away with her, but ultimately she is as brave and resourceful as the others. She likes doing the domestic things such as planning, organising and preparing meals, and keeping where they are staying clean and tidy, be it a cave, house, tent or caravan. In Smuggler's Top it is suggested she is claustrophobic, as she is frightened of enclosed spaces, which remind her of bad dreams. But the adventures invariably lead the five into tunnels, down wells, and into dungeons and other enclosed spaces, demonstrating how brave she really is.
 Alias Timmy is George's faithful dog.  He is a large, brown mongrel with a long tail. George adopted him after finding him abandoned on the moors as a puppy. He is very friendly; he is clever, affectionate and loyal to the children and to George in particular; he provides physical protection for them many times. Timmy's presence is frequently given as the reason the children's parents allow them to wander unsupervised.  George adores Timmy and thinks that he is the best dog in the world, and often becomes furious when people insult or threaten him. This is shown in 'Five On A Secret Trail' when she runs away from home with Timmy because he was being teased as he was forced to wear a cardboard collar. In the first book of the series, George's parents have forbidden her to keep Timmy, and she is forced to hide him with a fisher boy in the village. After the end of the Five's first adventure, her parents relent and she is allowed to keep him in the house and also take him with her to boarding school. It is a notable feature of the stories that Timmy's thoughts and feelings are frequently described.

Friends the Five meet
, the fisherboy, appears in some of the books set in Kirrin Cottage. In the first book, after George's parents forbid her to keep the dog, Alf keeps Timmy for her. Timmy adores Alf. Alf also looks after George's boat. In later books Alf only looks after George's boat, as George's parents let Timmy stay in the house. Alf also appears as James of the same background.
, the ragamuffin girl, clever but wild, joins the Five on three adventures near the end of the series. She is approximately the same age as the children and is a tomboy like George. Her parents were in the circus, but her mother died and her father was imprisoned for theft. She admires Dick and thinks the world of him.
 is the housekeeper at George's house. She is an extremely kind woman who is often present at Kirrin Cottage when Uncle Quentin and Aunt Fanny go off somewhere. All the four cousins are extremely attached to her. Joanna contracts scarlet fever in the last book. She is sometimes referred to as Joan in Blyton's Famous Five short stories like Five Have a Puzzling Time and other stories.
 appears in two books. He has a habit of imitating cars (which drives his father mad) and has a pet monkey called Mischief. His father is also a scientist who is Uncle Quentin's friend.
 is a friend of Jo's who works in the circus. The Five meet in him in the 14th book in the series, Five Have Plenty of Fun.
Wilfred meets the Five in the book Five Have a Mystery to Solve. He has an unexplainable ability of attracting animals.

Grown-ups in the Famous Five
 is George's mother, and aunt to Dick, Julian and Anne. She is married to Uncle Quentin, and is, through most of Blyton's Famous Five novels, the principal maternal figure in the lives of the children. She is a very kind and easy-going woman, and shows considerable patience with her husband over his short temper and absent-mindedness.
 is George's father, and a world-famous scientist, who is kidnapped or held hostage in several of the children's adventures. He possesses a quick temper and has little tolerance for the children on school holidays, but is nevertheless a loving and caring husband, father and uncle, and is extremely proud of his daughter. He is also inclined to be very absent-minded, as he finds it hard to switch off from his work and readjust to everyday life. Despite his fame as a scientist, his work does not earn him much money. In the first book of the series, it is established that he is brother to the father of Julian, Dick and Anne.
 is a very nice woman. In Five Go Off In a Caravan, she persuades the children's father to let them travel in the caravan. She's referred to as Mrs. Barnard in Five Get Into a Fix.
Mr. Roland is introduced in the second book. He is a tutor, and coaches the Five during the holidays. He then steals Uncle Quentin's important papers, but is caught by the Five.
Lucas appears in Five Have a Mystery to Solve.

Critical discussion
Blyton was a nature writer early in her career, and the books are strongly atmospheric, with a detailed but idealised presentation of the rural landscape. The books present children exploring this landscape without parental supervision as natural and normal. Pete Cash of the English Association has noted that the children "are allowed to go off on their own to an extent that today would contravene the Child Protection Act (1999) and interest Social Services."

The books are written in a nostalgic style even for the time they were written, avoiding reference to specific political events or technological developments. Cash noted that the characters do not watch television apart from one appearance in 1947, or even make much use of radios, despite George's father's work presumably involving advanced technology.

The books have been criticised for being repetitive, with repeated use of stock elements such as obnoxious, unfriendly people who turn out to be criminals and the discovery of a secret passageway. Blyton wrote rapidly and could finish a book in a week, which meant that unlike other book series of the period, such as Nancy Drew or The Hardy Boys, she was able to maintain control of her creations and write all the stories in a series herself.

The treatment of girls in the books provides a contrast, with Anne, the youngest and most fragile character, a contrast to the brash and headstrong George.

Floating timeline
The seemingly perpetual youth of the Famous Five, who experience a world of apparently endless holidays while not ageing significantly, is known as a floating timeline. Floating timelines allow for an episodic series with no defined end-point, but at the expense of losing a sense of the characters growing up. J. K. Rowling commented of her Harry Potter series that she deliberately intended to avoid this in her writing: "in book four the hormones are going to kick in – I don't want him stuck in a state of permanent pre-pubescence like poor Julian in the Famous Five!"

Bibliography

Enid Blyton's "Famous Five" novel series
Five on a Treasure Island (1942)
Five Go Adventuring Again (1943)
Five Run Away Together (1944)
Five Go to Smuggler's Top (1945)
Five Go Off in a Caravan (1946)
Five on Kirrin Island Again (1947)
Five Go Off to Camp (1948)
Five Get into Trouble (1949)
Five Fall into Adventure (1950)
Five on a Hike Together (1951)
Five Have a Wonderful Time (1952)
Five Go Down to the Sea (1953)
Five Go to Mystery Moor (1954)
Five Have Plenty of Fun (1955)
Five on a Secret Trail (1956)
Five Go to Billycock Hill (1957)
Five Get into a Fix (1958)
Five on Finniston Farm (1960)
Five Go to Demon's Rocks (1961)
Five Have a Mystery to Solve (1962)
Five Are Together Again (1963)
Blyton also wrote a number of short stories featuring the characters, which were collected together in 1995 as Five Have a Puzzling Time, and Other Stories.

These books can be found as ebooks in Ebook-Hunter.

Other book series

Claude Voilier
There are also books written originally in French by Claude Voilier (the Five have long been extremely popular in translation - by Voilier - in the French-speaking parts of Europe) and later translated into English. The Voilier titles are:

 Les Cinq sont les plus forts (1971; English title: The Famous Five and the Mystery of the Emeralds, English number: 2)
 Les Cinq au bal des espions (1971; English title: The Famous Five in Fancy Dress, English number: 7)
 Le Marquis appelle les Cinq (1972; English title: The Famous Five and the Stately Homes Gang, English number: 1)
 Les Cinq au Cap des tempêtes (1972; English title: The Famous Five and the Missing Cheetah, English number: 3)
 Les Cinq à la Télévision (1973; English title: The Famous Five Go on Television, English number: 4)
 Les Cinq et les pirates du ciel (1973; English title: The Famous Five and the Hijackers, English number: 13)
 Les Cinq contre le masque noir (1974; English title: The Famous Five Versus the Black Mask, English number: 6)
 Les Cinq et le galion d'or (1974; English title: The Famous Five and the Golden Galleon, English number: 5)
 Les Cinq font de la brocante (1975; English title: The Famous Five and the Inca God, English number: 9)
 Les Cinq se mettent en quatre (1975; English title: The Famous Five and the Pink Pearls, English number: 18)
 Les Cinq dans la cité secrète (1976; English title: The Famous Five and the Secret of the Caves, English number: 12)
 La fortune sourit aux Cinq (1976; English title: The Famous Five and the Cavalier's Treasure, English number: 10)
 Les Cinq et le rayon Z (1977; English title: The Famous Five and the Z-Rays, English number: 17)
 Les Cinq vendent la peau de l'ours (1977; English title: The Famous Five and the Blue Bear Mystery, English number: 8)
 Les Cinq aux rendez-vous du diable (1978; English title: The Famous Five in Deadly Danger, English number: 15)
 Du neuf pour les Cinq (1978; English title: The Famous Five and the Strange Legacy, English number: 11)
 Les Cinq et le trésor de Roquépine (1979; English title: The Famous Five and the Knights' Treasure, English Number: 16)
 Les Cinq et le diamant bleu (1979; reprinted in 1980 as Les Cinq et le rubis d'Akbar; (The Five and the Rubies Of Akbar))
 Les Cinq jouent serré (1980; English title: The Famous Five and the Strange Scientist, English number: 14)
 Les Cinq en croisière (1980; never translated into English; "The Five on a Cruise")
 Les Cinq contre les fantômes (1981; never translated into English; "The Five Against the Ghosts")
 Les Cinq en Amazonie (1983; never translated into English; "The Five in Amazonia")
 Les Cinq et le trésor du pirate (1984; never translated into English; "The Five and the Pirate's Treasure")
 Les Cinq contre le loup-garou (1985; never translated into English; "The Five against the werewolf")

The German "Geisterbände"
In Germany, two books came out with a questionable author. The titles are:

 Fünf Freunde auf der verbotenen Insel ("Five Friends on the Forbidden Island") (1977)
 Fünf Freunde und der blaue Diamant ("Five Friends and the Blue Diamond") (1979)
Fünf Freunde verfolgen die Strandräuber (1963)
Fünf Freunde jagen die Entführer (1966)
Although Enid Blyton is named as author on the cover, the books were most likely written by German author Brigitte Blobel, who is credited as the translator. The books were recalled after the first edition owing to copyright issues, and are now rare and high-priced collector's items.

Film and television adaptations

Films
There exist two Children's Film Foundation films of the Famous Five books: Five on a Treasure Island, made in 1957, and Five Have a Mystery to Solve, produced in 1964.

Two of the Famous Five stories by Enid Blyton have been filmed by Danish director Katrine Hedman. The cast consisted of Danish actors and were originally released in Danish. Ove Sprogøe stars as Uncle Quentin. The movies are:  (Five and the Spies) (1969) and De 5 i fedtefadet (Famous Five Get in Trouble) (1970).

All four of the films have been released on DVD in their respective countries.

In 2012 the movie Fünf Freunde was released in Germany, with Marcus Harris in a small role. Now also Fünf Freunde 2, 3 and 4.

Television

1978–79 series

The  Famous Five television series was produced by Southern Television and Portman Productions for ITV in the UK, in 26 episodes of thirty minutes (including time for advertisements). It starred Michele Gallagher as Georgina, Marcus Harris as Julian, Jennifer Thanisch as Anne, Gary Russell as Dick, Toddy Woodgate as Timmy, Michael Hinz as Uncle Quentin and Sue Best as Aunt Fanny. It also starred Ronald Fraser, John Carson, Patrick Troughton, James Villiers, Cyril Luckham and Brian Glover. The screenplays were written by Gloria Tors, Gail Renard, Richard Carpenter and Richard Sparks. The episodes were directed by Peter Duffell, Don Leaver, James Gatward and Mike Connor. The series was produced by Don Leaver and James Gatward. Most of the outdoor filming was done in the New Forest and parts of Dorset and Devon.The series was set in the present day, fifteen years after Blyton's last novel in the series.

Of the original 21 novels, three were not adapted for this series; Five on a Treasure Island and Five Have a Mystery to Solve because the Children's Film Foundation still own the film and TV rights to the books, while Five Have Plenty of Fun did not fit in the production schedule. Due to the success of the series, Southern Television were keen to make another season of episodes, but the Enid Blyton estate forbade them to create original stories.

The 1978 series was originally released on video by Portman Productions with reasonable regularity between 1983 and 1999, many of which are still easy to find second-hand, although the sound and picture quality is not always what it could be. A four-disc DVD collection, containing 23 of the 26 episodes produced for the 1978 series (and two episodes from the 1996 series) was released in region 4 (Australia and New Zealand) in 2005. The box and disc art identify it as a release of the 1996 series. (The distributor had licensed the 1996 series, but due to an administrative glitch was supplied with master tapes and artwork for the 1978 series.) The error was corrected in a later release.

A seven-DVD set containing the entire series and extensive bonus material was released in October 2010 in Germany by Koch Media; although there was an option to choose either the original English or German dubbed versions, the English version had non-removable German subtitles across the bottom of the screen on every episode. The same company released the DVD set in the UK (without the non-removable subtitles) on 25 June 2012.

A four DVD set containing all 26 episodes, without additional content, was released for region 4 (Australia and New Zealand) in late 2011, as Enid Blyton's The Famous Five: The Complete Collection.
(The Finnish punk band Widows (of Helsinki) made three different cover versions of the theme song, the first  in early 1979, as did the Irish indie outfit Fleur, in 1996.)

1995 series

A later series, The Famous Five, initiated by Victor Glynn of Portman Zenith was aired first in 1995, a co-production between a number of companies including Tyne Tees Television, HTV, Zenith North and the German channel ZDF. Unlike the previous TV series, this set the stories in the 1950s, around when they were written. It dramatised all the original books. Of the juvenile actors the best known is probably Jemima Rooper, who played George. Julian was portrayed by Marco Williamson, Dick by Paul Child, and Anne  by Laura Petela. In this series, because of the slang meaning of the word fanny, Aunt Fanny, played by Mary Waterhouse, was known as Aunt Frances. (In some but not all recent reprints of the book, the character has been re-christened Aunt Franny.)

The 1995 series was released in its entirety on VHS video. A three-disc DVD collection, containing 13 of the 26 episodes of the 1995 series, was released in Australia and New Zealand in 2005, and is marked "Revised Edition" to avoid confusion with the previous release of the 1979 series with 1995 artwork. Other episodes have reportedly been released on DVD in Europe, but only the adaptation of Five on a Treasure Island was released on DVD in the UK.

Famous 5: On the Case

A new Famous Five animated TV series began airing in 2008. Famous 5: On the Case is set in modern times and features the children of the original Famous Five: Max (the son of Julian and Brandine), Dylan (son of Dick and Michelle), Jo (daughter of George and Ravi – a tomboy who, like her mother, prefers a shorter name to her given name Jyoti) and Allie (daughter of Anne and John). It has not been stated whether their dog is a descendant of Timmy. The new series was first announced in 2005, and is a co-production of Chorion (which currently owns all Famous Five rights) and Marathon, in association with France 3 and The Disney Channel. Disney confirmed their involvement in December 2006. Stories were developed by Douglas Tuber and Tim Maile, who have previously written for Lizzie McGuire. Chorion claims on its website that "these new programmes will remain faithful to the themes of mystery and adventure central to Enid Blyton's classic series of books." In total, there will be 130 episodes, each 22 minutes long.

Other adaptations

Audio dramas
Hodder Headline produced in the late 1990s audio dramas in English, which were published on audio cassette and CD. All 21 episodes of the original books were dramatised.

The 21 original stories by Enid Blyton have been released in the 70s as Fünf Freunde audio dramas in Germany as well. The speakers were the German dubbing artists for Gallagher, Thanisch, Russell and Harris, the leads of the first television series.

For the sequels (not written by Blyton and decidedly more "modern" action-oriented stories) the speakers were replaced by younger ones, because it was felt that they sounded too mature. In addition to the original Blyton books, another 110+ stories have subsequently been released and published as radio plays and more than 30 books different from the radioplays in Germany. They are based on the original characters, but written by various German writers.

Theatre
A 1997 musical was made to celebrate the 100th anniversary of Enid Blyton's birth with the title The Famous Five and later released on DVD as The Famous Five – Smuggler's Gold – The Musical.
Principal actors: Elizabeth Marsland, Lyndon Ogbourne, Matthew Johnson, Vicky Taylor, Jon Lee, Director: Roz Storey
and also in the five

A brand new musical adaptation was premièred at the Tabard Theatre on 8 December 2009 and played until 10 January 2010.

Gamebooks
Two sets of gamebooks in a Choose Your Own Adventure style have been published. These books involve reading small sections of print and being given two or more options to follow, with a different page number for each option. The first series of these, written by Stephen Thraves, featured stories loosely based on the original books. They were issued in plastic wallets with accessories such as maps, dice and codebooks. The gamebooks were titled as follows:

The Wreckers' Tower Game, based on Five Go Down to the Sea
The Haunted Railway Game, based on Five Go Off to Camp
The Whispering Island Game, based on Five Have a Mystery to Solve
The Sinister Lake Game, based on Five On a Hike Together
The Wailing Lighthouse Game, based on Five Go to Demon's Rocks
The Secret Airfield Game, based on Five Go to Billycock Hill
The Shuddering Mountain Game, based on Five Get into a Fix
The Missing Scientist Game, based on Five Have a Wonderful Time

The second series, written by Mary Danby, was entitled "The Famous Five and You". These consisted of abridged versions of the original text, with additional text for the alternative story routes. The books in this series were based on the first six original Famous Five books:

The Famous Five and You Search for Treasure!
The Famous Five and You Find Adventure!
The Famous Five and You Run Away!
The Famous Five and You Search for Smugglers!
The Famous Five and You Take Off!
The Famous Five and You Underground!

Comics
A weekly comic strip based on the 1978 television series was published in Look-in magazine from 1978 to 1980.

Six comic albums drawn by Bernard Dufossé and scripted by Serge Rosenzweig and Rafael Carlo Marcello were released in France between 1982 and 1986, under the title Le Club des Cinq. Most of comic books in the series are based on Famous Five books created by Claude Voilier. Books were released by Hachette Livre. The first three of these volumes have also been released in English, under the name Famous Five. The titles included "Famous Five and the Golden Galleon" (which featured a sunken ship that was laden with gold with the Five fending off villains seeking to make off with the gold, "Famous Five and the Treasure of the Templars", where it transpires that Kirrin Castle is actually a Templar Castle that houses their hidden treasure which the Five ultimately secure with the help of members of the order, and "Famous Five and the Inca God" which was set in an antiquities museum and dealt with the theft of an Incan fetish.

Beginning in September 1985 a series of monthly Comic Magazine titles Enid Blyton's Adventure Magazine were published. Each issue published a full length illustrative comic book story adapted from Famous 5 Novels. The series came to end in the 1990s.

Parodies

The Comic Strip Presents...
The Five inspired the parody Five Go Mad in Dorset (1982) and its 1983 sequel Five Go Mad on Mescalin, both produced by The Comic Strip, in which the characters express sympathies with Nazi Germany and opposition to the Welfare State, homosexuals, immigrants and Jews, in an extremely broad parody not so much of Blyton but of views perceived to be common in the 1950s. The parodies were deliberately set towards the end of the original Famous Five "era" (1942–63) so as to make the point that the books were already becoming outmoded while they were still being written. Both parodies made use of Famous Five set pieces, such as the surrender of the criminals at the end when Julian states "We're the Famous Five!", the arrival of the police just in the nick of time, and the appeal for "some of your home-made ices" at a village shop. Unlike the books, the four children in the Comic Strip parody are all siblings, and none is the child of Aunt Fanny and Uncle Quentin.

The series was revived in 2012 with Five Go to Rehab, with the original cast reprising their roles, now well into middle-age. Reuniting for Dick's birthday after decades apart, the four and Toby lament how their lives took unexpected paths while Dick drags them on another bicycle adventure, which he had meticulously planned for fourteen years. In a reversal, George had married a series of wealthy men whom she cuckolded with, among others, one of her stepsons (her continuing penchant for bestiality with the latest Timmy is also implied); whereas Anne has become a strongly opinionated vegan spinster and is suspected by Dick of being a "dyke" – an accusation made against George by Toby in the original Five Go Mad in Dorset. George and Julian have been committed to an alcoholics' sanatorium, the latter owes a large debt to African gangsters, and Anne recently served a prison sentence for setting her nanny aflame. Robbie Coltrane reprised both of his roles. Five Go to Rehab utilises a form of a floating timeline; although the original films' events are said to have taken place thirty years in the past and "five years after the war", the reunion film appears to be set approximately contemporaneous to its filming.

Others

Parodies began early: in 1964, only the year after the last book was published, John Lennon in his work In His Own Write had the short story The Famous Five through Woenow Abbey. Amidst a plethora of deliberate misspellings, he lists ten members of the Five, and a dog named Cragesmure.

Viz comic has parodied the series' style of writing and type of stories on a number of occasions.

In the late eighties, Australian comedy team The D-Generation parodied The Famous Five on their breakfast radio show as a five-part serial entitled The Famous Five Get Their Teeth Kicked In. The parody was based on the first book Five on a Treasure Island.

The fourth short story in Fearsome Tales for Fiendish Kids by Jamie Rix is named "The Chipper Chums Go Scrumping", which is about five children in 1952 on a picnic in Kent during the summer holidays. After their nap, the youngest wants an apple to eat so the children decide to steal from a nearby orchard, but they are caught by the owner, who is armed with a shotgun. It was later adapted for the Grizzly Tales for Gruesome Kids cartoon, which aired on CITV in 2000.

A 2005 story in The Guardian also parodies the Famous Five. It argues that Anne, Dick, George and Julian are caricatures rather than characters, portraying Anne as having no life outside of domestic labour. It highlights what the writer, Lucy Mangan, considers to be the power struggle between Dick, George and Julian while Anne is sidelined.

On 31 October 2009, the BBC programme The Impressions Show featured a sketch in which Ross Kemp meets The Famous Five. It was a parody of his Sky One show, Ross Kemp on Gangs.

British comedian John Finnemore did a radio sketch in which Julian and George run into each other as adults and reminisce. It is revealed that Julian has gone on to a career as a smuggler and regularly has to deal with copycat groups of children trying to thwart his plans. George is a happily married mother, Dick has gone to live in a commune in America, and Anne has just been released from prison having murdered a man with a ginger beer bottle.

Bert Fegg's Nasty Book for Boys and Girls features "The Famous Five Go Pillaging", – a short story which parodies the writing style of Enid Blyton; five children witness the collapse of Roman imperialism and their friends and family are slaughtered by 9000 invading Vikings.

Website The Daily Mash reported a lost Blyton manuscript titled "Five Go Deporting Gypsies".

A spoof series of five books written by Bruno Vincent was published in November 2016. The books are titled Five Give Up the Booze, Five Go Gluten Free, Five Go On A Strategy Away Day, Five Go Parenting and Five on Brexit Island. Vincent went on to write several more titles in the series: Five at the Office Christmas Party, Five Get Gran Online, Five Get On the Property Ladder, Five Go Bump in the Night, Five Escape Brexit Island, Five Get Beach Body Ready, Five Lose Dad in the Garden Centre, and Five Forget Mother's Day.

In November 2017, Return to Kirrin was released, written by Neil and Suzy Howlett. Set in 1979, it involves the Five (now middle-aged) reuniting on Kirrin Island, to discuss Julian's plans to develop Kirrin into a theme resort. Julian has become a successful stockbroker, Dick is a well-meaning but inept and overweight policeman, Anne is a worrisome housewife, and George is a feminist community worker (with her flatulent bulldog Gary in tow). Adventures then ensue, involving a host of other original characters.

References
Notes

Citations

External links
Famous Five Book Reviews & Articles

 
Book series introduced in 1942
British children's novels
Enid Blyton series
Hodder & Stoughton books
Novels set in Dorset
SAM Coupé games
ZX Spectrum games